The Golden Plague is a 1954 West German drama film directed by John Brahm and starring Ivan Desny, Karlheinz Böhm, and Gertrud Kückelmann. The film's sets were designed by the art director Alfred Bütow. Location shooting took place in Dotzheim and Kaiserslautern.

Plot
Ivan Desny plays a disillusioned exile returning to Germany from the United States. The film centers around drug trafficking and the black market.

Cast
Ivan Desny as Sergeant Hartwig
Karlheinz Böhm as Karl Hellmer
Gertrud Kückelmann as Franziska Hellmer
Wilfried Seyferth as Wenzeslaw Kolowrat
Elise Aulinger as Johanna Neureither
Heinz Hilpert as Tonder
Ilse Fürstenberg as Mrs. Försterling
Erich Ponto as Dr. Sierich
Alexander Golling as Hamann
Ethel Reschke as Lola
Joachim Rake as Captain Tyler

Reception

Award nominations
Karlheinz Böhm was nominated for the 1955 Bambi Award best German actor
Erich Ponto was nominated for the 1955 German Film Awards as best supporting actor

See also
Black Gravel (1961)

References

External links

1954 drama films
German drama films
West German films
Films directed by John Brahm
German black-and-white films
1950s German films